Le Minou is the site of a popular surfing beach and a lighthouse at the entrance to Brest harbor in France. It is part of the commune of Plouzané, on the north side of the Goulet de Brest.

"Le Minou" means "pussy cat" in French. Le Minou is the site of the landfall of the first French transatlantic telegraph cable in 1869.

References

 A picture of the beach and lighthouse at Le Minou
 Description of the French transatlantic telegraph cable

See also
Petit Minou Lighthouse

Beaches of Metropolitan France
Brest, France
Landforms of Brittany